Frank R. Moe (October 21, 1965 – January 12, 2022) was an American politician and educator.

Moe was born in Bloomington, Minnesota and graduated from Jefferson High School in Bloomington. He received his bachelor's degree from Carleton College and his master's degree from University of North Carolina. Moe also took graduate courses at University of Minnesota. Moe lived in Bemidji, Minnesota with his wife and taught at Bemidji State University. Moe served in the Minnesota House of Representatives from 2005 to 2008 and was a Democrat. Moe later moved to Grand Marais, Minnesota, with his wife, and was a sled dog owner and racer. He died from brain cancer in Grand Marias, Minnesota, on January 12, 2022, at the age of 56.

References

1965 births
2022 deaths
People from Bemidji, Minnesota
People from Bloomington, Minnesota
People from Cook County, Minnesota
Bemidji State University faculty
Carleton College alumni
University of Minnesota alumni
University of North Carolina alumni
Democratic Party members of the Minnesota House of Representatives
American dog mushers
Deaths from brain cancer in the United States
Deaths from cancer in Minnesota
Neurological disease deaths in Minnesota